Agustín Díaz Yanes (born 1950, in Madrid) is a Spanish Goya Award-winning screenwriter and film director.

Filmography

Screenwriter 
 Al límite (1997)
 Belmonte (1995)
 Demasiado corazón (1992)
 A solas contigo (1990)
 Baton Rouge (1988)
 Barrios altos (1987)

Film director and screenwriter

External links 

Spanish male screenwriters
Film directors from Madrid
Living people
1950 births
Writers from Madrid